Trsek ( or ) is a small village in the City Municipality of Koper in the Littoral region of Slovenia.

The local church is dedicated to Saint Bridget and belongs to the Parish of Truške.

References

External links
Trsek on Geopedia

Populated places in the City Municipality of Koper